Richelieu may refer to:

People
 Cardinal Richelieu (Armand-Jean du Plessis, 1585–1642), Louis XIII's chief minister
 Alphonse-Louis du Plessis de Richelieu (1582–1653), French Carthusian bishop and Cardinal
 Louis François Armand du Plessis, duc de Richelieu (1696–1788), marshal of France, grandnephew of the cardinal
 Emmanuel-Armand de Richelieu, duc d'Aiguillon (1720–1782), statesman, nephew of the marshal
 Armand-Emmanuel du Plessis, Duc de Richelieu, (1766–1822), statesman, grandson of the marshal
 Duke of Richelieu, a title in the peerage of France created for Cardinal Richelieu
 Andreas du Plessis de Richelieu (1852–1932), Danish naval officer and businessman
 Richelieu Levoyer (1930–2015), politician of the Republic of Ecuador

Places
 Richelieu, Quebec, Canada
 Richelieu (electoral district), Quebec
 Richelieu (provincial electoral district), Quebec
 Richelieu River, Quebec
 Richelieu River (Montmorency River tributary), in La Jacques-Cartier Regional County Municipality, Capitale-Nationale, Quebec, Canada
 Richelieu, Indre-et-Loire, France

Ships
  (1873)
  (1939)
 French ship Richelieu
 , originally named Richelieu
 , a lake freighter for Canada Steamship Lines

Entertainment
 Richelieu (play), a play written by Edward Bulwer-Lytton, 1839
 Richelieu (film), a 1914 film based on the play
 Richelieu (novel), a novel written by George Payne Rainsford James, 1829

Other 

 The French term for Oxford shoes